The Pegaso University ( or Pegaso Università Telematica), often abbreviated as "Unipegaso", is an open (Italian: aperta) university founded in 2006 in Naples, Italy. The university is accredited and recognized by the Italian Ministry of Education.

Method of Study
It provides blended academic courses and it spreads across Italy (over 90 regions) and abroad.

Academic qualifications awarded by public or private Open Universities are equal in academic standard to qualifications issued by traditional on-campus institutions. They have the same legal value, they are well-respected, and they are highly preferred during the COVID-19 pandemic.

Structure and Organization

The Pegaso University offers degree programmes upon a variety of academic fields including Economics, Law, Development and Engineering, Education, Linguistics, Communication and Media Studies, Tourism, Management, Psychology, etc.

All academic programmes are fully recognised by the Italian Government (MIUR GU n. 118 del 23.5.2006 – SO n. 125), being highly respected and approved of by similar open/distance institutions in Europe and abroad, including the Open University of the UK.

Pegaso International Higher Education Institution (Republic of Malta) is a stand-alone member institution, fully recognised by the Maltese Government, belongs to the British Commonwealth Academic Association, and offers International Bachelor's, Master's, and Doctoral programmes in Malta, Italy and abroad - all of which are fully and unconditionally recognized as European Qualifications.

It is part of Euro-Mediterranean Union (UNIMED), along with other universities such as the University of Strasbourg (France), the University of Barcelona (Spain), the National and Kapodistrian University of Athens (Greece), the University of Cyprus (Cyprus), etc. As an international academic institution, Pegaso is fully accredited by ASIC UK (Accreditation Service for International Schools, Colleges and Universities) on the grounds of its Premises, Health, Safety, Governance, Learning, Teaching and Research Activity, Immigration Regulations etc.

This University belongs to the 21st century distance-learning institutions and goes in tandem with other recent and technologically-powerful institutions, like Università Telematica Universitas Mercatorum, Frederick University, Università degli Studi eCampus, Open University of Hong Kong, Open University Malaysia, Open University of the Netherlands etc.

Accreditation and memberships 

 MIUR – Ministero dell' Istruzione / Ministero dell' Università e della Ricerca
 ASIC UK Accredited
 The Hellenic/Greek Ministry of Education (ΥΠΕΠΘ) and the Hellenic/Greek Naric (DOATAP/ΔΟΑΤΑΠ)
 QISAN
 ISO 14001:2004 certified
 ISO 9001:2008 certified
 EMUNI – Euro-Mediterranean University of Slovenia
 UNIMED – Unione delle Università del Mediterraneo (Mediterranean Universities Union)
 SVIMEZ – Associazione per lo sviluppo dell’industria nel Mezzogiorno (Association for the development of Southern Italy Business)
 RUIAP – Rete Universitaria Italiana per l’Apprendimento Permanente (Italian Lifelong Learning University Net)
 Pegaso Online University is member of Multiversity SpA alliance:
 Universitas Mercatorum (Republic of Italy EU);
 Pegaso International (Republic of Malta EU);
 European Polytechnical University (Republic of Bulgaria EU)

See also 
 List of Italian universities
 Naples
 Distance education 
Hellenic Open University
Marconi University
Università degli Studi Niccolò Cusano
Open University of Cyprus
Università telematica internazionale Uninettuno
Open University
Ministry of Education, University and Research (Italy)
Pegasus

References

External links 
 Pegaso University Website (Homepage) (in Italian)

Universities and colleges in Naples
Private universities and colleges in Italy
Educational institutions established in 2006
Buildings and structures in Naples
Distance education institutions based in Italy
2006 establishments in Italy